Ananyino is a rural locality (a village) in Vysokovskoye Rural Settlement, Ust-Kubinsky District, Vologda Oblast, Russia. The population was 1 as of 2002.

Geography 
Ananyino is located 12 km northeast of Ustye (the district's administrative centre) by road. Kanskoye is the nearest rural locality.

References 

Rural localities in Ust-Kubinsky District